Cheslyn Hay is a former mining village and civil parish which is contiguous with Great Wyrley and Landywood in Staffordshire, England. It is situated within the South Staffordshire district some 3 miles south of Cannock, 7 miles north of Walsall, 8.5 miles northeast of Wolverhampton (the closest city) and 12.5 miles south of the county town of Stafford. The West Midlands county border lies 2 miles to the south.

History
The Hawkins family were a prominent family in the area in the 19th century.

During the 19th century the area was known colloquially as the Wyrley Bank (in the local dialect Wyrley Bonk).

Before World War II there was a cinema at the top of Rosemary Road, on the site much later occupied by Barts Motors. The housing stock has grown significantly in each post-war decade, with suburban expansion into surrounding fields.

Cheslyn Hay became part of an investigation into the unsolved murder in 1993 of Kuwaiti businessman Adnan al Sane when his battered severed head was found there having been thrown into the playing field of the then High School. The victim, whose body was found in Manchester, had no connection with this area and despite his successful identification, the murderers were never traced.

Business and industry
Station Street is the main street with some small shops. A major employer in the village is B.S. Eaton Ltd, a manufacturer of concrete products who operate a fleet of distinctive orange trucks. Another large employer is PP Control & Automation Ltd, a manufacturer of automation machinery.

Education
The old Primary School was situated on the site bounded by Hatherton Street, Pinfold Lane, Hill Street and High Street. It was constructed circa 1883 and demolished in the 1990s and the land used for new housing. An additional modern building on the opposite side of Pinfold Lane was used for school meals and gym.

The village is now served by two primary schools (Glenthorne Primary School and Cheslyn Hay Primary School) and by one secondary school, Cheslyn Hay Academy.

Notable residents
 Charlie Moore (born 1893 in Cheslyn Hay - 1966), was an English football full back. In his early days, he played for Hednesford Town. In May 1919, he was sold to Manchester United. He stayed with United until his retirement in 1931. During his United career, he made 328 appearances, although he scored no goals.
 Anthony Read (1935 in Cheslyn Hay – 2015) a British script editor, television writer and author. He was principally active in British television from the 1960s to the mid-1980s

Schools 
There are three local schools in Cheslyn Hay:

Cheslyn Hay Academy (constructed 1977)
Cheslyn Hay Primary School
Glenthorne Primary School

Public Transport
Rail
Landywood railway station, which opened in 1989, is the nearest station.  Previously the village was served by Wyrley and Cheslyn Hay railway station which closed in 1965. Until 1 January 1916, the LNWR also operated a halt at nearby Landywood.

Landywood station provides services south to Birmingham New Street and north to Rugeley Trent Valley. It is currently operated by the West Midlands Railway franchise.
Buses
Cheslyn Hay acts as a hub to Cannock, Bloxwich, Walsall, Stafford and Wolverhampton. There are three services:
D&G Bus Chaserider route 1A
D&G Bus Chaserider route 70
D&G Bus Chaserider route 71

These services were previously operated by Arriva Midlands. Select Bus began operating service 71 following Arriva axing the service while D&G Bus began operating services 2 & 70 in January 2021 following the acquisition of Arriva's Cannock depot. 

In May 2021, Chaserider announced a number of service changes which came into effect on 21 June 2021. This saw service 71 operated by Chaserider, service 70 to serve New Cross Hospital before Wolverhampton and service 74 extended hourly to Walsall. The 74 extension was curtailed back to Cannock and replaced by 1A serving Cannock and Walsall via Leamore. However, there are still no Chaserider buses on Sundays and Bank Holidays.  

There are also school services 67S and 71B that run during term time to Cheslyn Hay Academy. Due to COVID-19 travel restrictions,  these routes are closed services for the use of students only. They are operated by Select Bus.

See also
Listed buildings in Cheslyn Hay

References

External links 

 Cheslyn Hay Primary School
 Cheslyn Hay Sport and Community High School
 Cheslyn Hay Local History Society
 Cheslyn Hay Library
 Glenthorne Primary School

Villages in Staffordshire
South Staffordshire District